Caulanthus glaucus is a species of flowering plant in the family Brassicaceae known by the common names glaucous wild cabbage, bigleaf wildcabbage, and limestone jewelflower.

It is native to southern Nevada and adjacent parts of eastern California and Mojave Desert sky islands, where it grows in open, rocky habitat in the desert mountains.

Description
Caulanthus glaucus is a perennial herb producing a slender, branching stem from a woody caudex.

The largest of the leaves appear in a cluster at the base of the plant, and are oblong or oval and up to 10 centimeters long. Smaller, lance-shaped leaves appear higher up on the stem.

The flower has a coat of thick green sepals over narrow yellowish or purplish petals. The fruit is a long, thin silique which may approach 15 centimeters in length.

References

External links
Jepson Manual Treatment: Caulanthus glaucus
USDA Plants Profile
Caulanthus glaucus — U.C. Photo gallery

glaucus
Flora of the California desert regions
Flora of Nevada
Natural history of the Mojave Desert